Events during the year 1111 in Italy.

Deaths
 Roger Borsa
 Richard II of Gaeta
 Berthold of Parma
 Felicia Cornaro

Sources
Norwich, John Julius. The Normans in the South 1016-1130. Longmans: London, 1967.
Norwich, John Julius. The Kingdom in the Sun 1130-1194. Longman: London, 1970.
Matthew, Donald. The Norman Kingdom of Sicily. Cambridge University Press: 1992.
Chronology of the ipati, consuls, dukes, princes, kings, and emperors who governed Gaeta from the 9th to the 13th Century.
The Coins of Gaeta.
Gregorovius, Ferdinand. Rome in the Middle Ages Vol. IV Part 1. 1905.
  Staley, Edgcumbe: The dogaressas of Venice : The wives of the doges. London : T. W. Laurie

Years of the 12th century in Italy
Italy
Italy